Andres de Saya is a 2011 Philippine television situational comedy series broadcast by GMA Network. The series is a television adaptation of comic novel of Carlo J. Caparas. Directed by Cesar Cosme, it stars Cesar Montano and Iza Calzado. It premiered on May 28, 2011 replacing Mind Master. The series concluded on August 21, 2011 with a total of 13 episodes.

Overview
Andres de Saya was first introduced as a form of comics, written by Carlo J. Caparas. Later on, in 1980, it was adapted into a film with Vic Vargas on the title role, and Gloria Diaz as his wife. After which, two parts of the said movie followed. The second and third part of the movie which was shown in 1982 and 1986, respectively, was titled, Andres de Saya (Mabagsik na daw!) and Anomalya ni... Andres de Saya with Vargas and Diaz reprising their roles.

Premise
Andres "Andy" Taguyod, a seemingly perfect peg of a tough, macho man. He works as a bouncer in a "gimik" bar and provides for his kin; he does not aspire to be rich but his ultimate dream is to marry a woman he really loves.

When he met Matilde "Mat" Golpe de Oro, Andres knew that he has found the woman of his dreams. Matilde came from a well-off family and is a title holder in many beauty pageants. Although she was not initially attracted to Andres, circumstances brought them to each other's arms in a shotgun wedding.

One night, Matilde ended up in Andres' bed due to drunkenness and although nothing really happened between them, Matilde's grandmother made a big deal out of it. Lola Coring, played by Ms. Gloria Romero, insisted that the two get married despite the fact that she does not approve of Andres for her granddaughter.

Cast and characters

Lead cast
 Cesar Montano as Andres "Andy" Taguyod
 Iza Calzado as Matilde "Matt" Golpe De Oro-Taguyod

Supporting cast
 Gloria Romero as Mama Coring
 Caridad Sanchez as Minda
 Fabio Ide as Victor Del Mundo
 Elmo Magalona as Bryan
 Julie Anne San Jose as Lizzy
 Jillian Ward as Jecjec
 Chariz Solomon as Charing
 Mike "Pekto" Nacua as Adonis "Tsong" Penyaratot

Guest cast
 Iwa Moto as Nica Landutay

Ratings
According to AGB Nielsen Philippines' Mega Manila People/Individual television ratings, the pilot episode of Andres de Saya earned a 9.9% rating. While the final episode scored an 11.6% rating.

Accolades

References

External links
 

2011 Philippine television series debuts
2011 Philippine television series endings
Filipino-language television shows
GMA Network original programming
Philippine comedy television series
Television shows based on comics
Television shows set in the Philippines